Desmond Morton Code (16 November 1912 – 19 January 1980) was a Progressive Conservative party member of the House of Commons of Canada. He was a construction superintendent and contractor by career.

He was first elected at the Lanark riding in the 1965 general election. His second term in Parliament was served at Leeds riding which he won in the 1968 election. Code left federal office in 1972 after completing his term in the 28th Canadian Parliament and has since not campaigned in another federal election.

Code died at a Kingston hospital on 19 January 1980. He was buried at Hillcrest Cemetery in Smiths Falls.

References

External links
 

1912 births
1980 deaths
Members of the House of Commons of Canada from Ontario
Progressive Conservative Party of Canada MPs
Canadian builders